119th meridian may refer to:

119th meridian east, a line of longitude east of the Greenwich Meridian
119th meridian west, a line of longitude west of the Greenwich Meridian